Michael Robert Gale (born May 25, 1951) is an American screenwriter, comic book writer, film producer and director. He is best known for co-writing the science fiction comedy film Back to the Future with his writing partner Robert Zemeckis. Gale co-produced all three films of the franchise and later served as associate producer of the animated TV series. Actor Michael J. Fox has referred to Gale as the "gatekeeper of the [Back to the Future] franchise".

Early life
Gale was born to a Jewish family in University City, Missouri; he is the son of Maxine (née Kippel and died in 2010), an art dealer and violinist, and Mark R. Gale (1922–2018), an attorney. Mark Gale was a World War II veteran and later a University City councilman. Bob Gale has two younger brothers, Charlie, who wrote the screenplay for Ernest Scared Stupid, and Randy. Bob Gale received a B.A. in Cinema in 1973 from the University of Southern California, where he wrote fanzine reviews for classmate Mike Glyer's fanzine, and met Zemeckis, who was his classmate.

As a child, Gale dreamed he would one day "go to Hollywood and work for Walt Disney", who was his hero. As a teen, he created his own comic book, The Green Vomit, using spirit duplication; he was the co-founder of a popular comic book club in St. Louis. Later he and his brother Charlie made their own amateur three-film series parody of the Republic Pictures Commando Cody serials, using the character name "Commando Cus". The last two films  were made in collaboration with Richard Rosenberg. (Rosenberg had taken over the series with the third, 1973's Commando Cus vs. Kung Fu Killers, in which Gale made a cameo appearance as the title character without his face-covering helmet, and was working on a fourth at the time of his death.)

Career

Film
As screenwriters Gale and Zemeckis have collaborated on a number of films including 1941, I Wanna Hold Your Hand, Used Cars, and Trespass. The last one was set in East St. Louis, Illinois near Gale's home town. Gale and Zemeckis were nominated for an Academy Award for their screenplay for Back to the Future. In 2002, Gale made his debut as a feature-film director with Interstate 60: Episodes of the Road. He had previously directed and written the 20-minute theatrical release Mr. Payback: An Interactive Movie. Gale's other work includes the novelization for his movie 1941 and he helped develop the arcade game Tattoo Assassins.

On 31 January 2014, it was announced that a stage musical adaptation of the first Back to the Future film was in production.

Comics
As a teenager, Bob Gale was a regular Marvel reader and his fan letter appeared in Iron Man #2, published in June 1968.

Gale began writing for comics in the late 90s, and his earliest work includes Ant-Man's Big Christmas for Marvel and Batman for DC Comics. In 2001, he had a short run on Marvel's Daredevil with artists Phil Winslade and Dave Ross. In 2008, Gale worked as one of the writers among the rotating writer/artist teams on The Amazing Spider-Man, which at the time was published three times a month. His other work in comics includes the Back to the Future monthly series published by IDW Publishing. The first issue was released in stores on October 21, 2015, which is the same date that Marty travels with Doc Brown to the future; the comic book is shown as part of the storyline for Part II.

Selected filmography
Kolchak: The Night Stalker (episode "Chopper", with Robert Zemeckis, 1975) (TV)
I Wanna Hold Your Hand (with Robert Zemeckis, 1978)
1941 (with Robert Zemeckis, 1979)
Used Cars (with Robert Zemeckis, 1980)
Back to the Future (with Robert Zemeckis, 1985)
Back to the Future Part II (with Robert Zemeckis, 1989)
Back to the Future Part III (with Robert Zemeckis, 1990)
Trespass (with Robert Zemeckis, 1992)
Back to the Future: The Animated Series (1991–1992) (TV)
Tales from the Crypt (episode "House of Horror", also director, 1993) (TV)
Mr. Payback: An Interactive Movie (also director, 1995)
Bordello of Blood (with Robert Zemeckis, story only, 1996)
Interstate 60: Episodes of the Road (also director, 2002)

Bibliography

DC Comics
Batman:
The Batman Chronicles #10: "To See the Batman" (prose story with illustrations by Bill Sienkiewicz, anthology, 1997)
Batman: No Man's Land Volume 1 (tpb, 544 pages, 2011) and Batman: No Man's Land Omnibus Volume 1 (hc, 1,136 pages, 2022) include:
 Batman: No Man's Land #1 + Batman: Shadow of the Bat #83 + Batman #563 + Detective Comics #730: "No Law and a New Order" (with Alex Maleev, 1999)
 Detective Comics #733: "Shades of Grey" (with Phil Winslade, 1999)

Marvel Comics
Ant-Man's Big Christmas (with Phil Winslade, one-shot, Marvel Knights, 2000)
Daredevil vol. 2 #20–25 (with Phil Winslade and Dave Ross (#23–24), Marvel Knights, 2001) collected in Marvel Knights: Daredevil — Unusual Suspects (tpb, 472 pages, 2018)
Spider-Man:
The Amazing Spider-Man:
 Brand New Day Volume 1 (hc, 200 pages, 2008, ; tpb, 2008) includes:
 "The Astonishing Aunt May!" (with Phil Winslade, co-feature in #546, 2008)
 Brand New Day Volume 2 (hc, 168 pages, 2009, ; tpb, 2008) includes:
 "Freak-Out!" (with Phil Jimenez, #552–554, 2008)
 "Freak the Third" (with Barry Kitson, in #558, 2008)
 Brand New Day Volume 3 (hc, 120 pages, 2008, ; tpb, 2009) includes:
 "The Other Spider-Man" (with Mike McKone, in #562–563, 2008)
 Kraven's First Hunt (hc, 112 pages, 2008, ; tpb, 2009) includes:
 "Threeway Collision!" (co-written by Gale, Dan Slott and Marc Guggenheim, art by Paulo Siqueira, in #564, 2008)
 Died in Your Arms Tonight (hc, 192 pages, 2009, ; tpb, 2010) includes:
 "If I was Spider-Man..." (with Mario Alberti, co-feature in #600, 2009)
 Origin of the Species (hc, 232 pages, 2011, ; tpb, 2011) includes:
 "Stand Off" (with Karl Kesel, co-feature in #647, 2010)
The Amazing Spider-Man Digital #1–10: "The Private Life of Peter Parker" (with Pat Olliffe, anthology, 2009–2010)
 First published in print as the first four issues of the 5-issue limited series titled Peter Parker (2010)
 Collected in Spider-Man: Peter Parker (tpb, 136 pages, 2010)

IDW Publishing
Back to the Future (scripted by various writers from plots by Gale):
Back to the Future vol. 2 (written by John Barber and Erik Burnham (#1–5), art by various artists, 2015–2017) collected as:
 Untold Tales and Alternate Timelines (collects #1–5, tpb, 120 pages, 2017)
 Continuum Conundrum (collects #6–11, tpb, 136 pages, 2016)
 Who is... Marty McFly? (collects #12–17, tpb, 136 pages, 2017)
 Hard Time (collects #18–21, tpb, 96 pages, 2017)
 Time Served (collects #22–25, tpb, 104 pages, 2018)
Back to the Future: Citizen Brown #1–5 (written by Erik Burnham, drawn by Alan Robinson, 2016) collected as Back to the Future: Citizen Brown (tpb, 120 pages, 2017)
Back to the Future: Biff to the Future #1–6 (written by Derek Fridolfs, drawn by Alan Robinson, 2017) collected as Back to the Future: Biff to the Future (tpb, 148 pages, 2017)
Back to the Future: Tales from the Time Train #1–6 (written by John Barber, drawn by Megan Levens, 2017–2018) collected as Back to the Future: Tales from the Time Train (tpb, 152 pages, 2018)

References

External links
 
 10 Questions at IGN

1951 births
American comics writers
20th-century American Jews
American male screenwriters
California Republicans
Hugo Award-winning writers
Living people
Writers from St. Louis
USC School of Cinematic Arts alumni
Film producers from Missouri
Screenwriters from Missouri
21st-century American Jews